The North American section of the 2018 FIVB Volleyball Men's Challenger Cup qualification acted as a qualifier for the 2018 FIVB Volleyball Men's Challenger Cup, for national teams which are members of the North, Central America and Caribbean Volleyball Confederation (NORCECA). The tournament was held in Pinar del Río, Cuba from 5 to 9 June 2018. The winners Cuba qualified for the 2018 Challenger Cup.

Qualification
6 NORCECA national teams entered qualification. But, Mexico later withdrew.

 (Hosts)

Venue
 Sala 19 de noviembre, Pinar del Río, Cuba

Pool standing procedure
 Number of matches won
 Match points
 Sets ratio
 Points ratio
 Result of the last match between the tied teams

Match won 3–0: 5 match points for the winner, 0 match points for the loser
Match won 3–1: 4 match points for the winner, 1 match point for the loser
Match won 3–2: 3 match points for the winner, 2 match points for the loser

Round robin
All times are Cuba Daylight Time (UTC−04:00).

Final standing
{| class="wikitable" style="text-align:center"
|-
!width=40|Rank
!width=180|Team
|- bgcolor=#ccffcc
|1
|style="text-align:left"|
|-
|2
|style="text-align:left"|
|-
|3
|style="text-align:left"|
|-
|4
|style="text-align:left"|
|-
|5
|style="text-align:left"|
|}

References

External links
2018 Challenger Cup North American Qualifier – official website

2018 FIVB Volleyball Men's Challenger Cup qualification
FIVB
2018 in Cuban sport
International volleyball competitions hosted by Cuba
FIVB Volleyball Men's Challenger Cup qualification